"Voice of Reason" is a song by Australian rock-pop band Noiseworks. It was released in January 1989 as the second single from their second studio album Touch (1988) and peaked at number 43 on the ARIA singles chart.

Track listing
7" vinyl / CD single (654547 7)

Charts

External links
 https://www.discogs.com/Noiseworks-Voice-Of-Reason/release/3409830

References

Noiseworks songs
1988 songs
1989 singles
CBS Records singles
Songs written by Jon Stevens